Yong-gi, also spelled Yong-ki, is a Korean masculine given name. The meaning differs based on the hanja used to write each syllable of the name. There are 24 hanja with the reading "yong" and 68 hanja with the reading "gi" on the South Korean government's official list of hanja which may be used in given names.

People with this name include:
David Yonggi Cho (born 1936), South Korean Christian minister
Oh Young-ki (born 1965), South Korean former handball player 
Kim Yong-Gi (footballer) (born 1989), South Korean footballer
Kim Yong-ki (1908–1988), South Korean agrarian activist
Lee Yong-Gi (born 1985), South Korean footballer
Ryang Yong-Gi (born 1982), Zainichi Korean footballer

See also
List of Korean given names

References

Korean masculine given names